Hickman is a city in Lancaster County, Nebraska, United States. It is part of the Lincoln, Nebraska Metropolitan Statistical Area. The population was 1,657 at the 2010 census.  Hickman was founded by Reverend C.H. Heckman and incorporated in 1885. There are several restaurants in Hickman, including Subway, East Meets West, Godfather´s, and The Mettle Grill. There is also a bar located downtown.

History
Prior to 1885, the city of Hickman was known as Heckman; named after founder Reverend C.H. Heckman.  Prior to 1866, the land was open prairie.  Reverend Heckman was an early settler purchasing land near the Salt Creek.  Heckman was platted in 1872 by Reverend Heckman and Samuel Egger after a station was accepted on the route of the Atchison and Nebraska Railroad from Rulo, Nebraska to Lincoln, Nebraska.  However, when Reverend Heckman and Samuel Egger submitted the plat for Heckman to Lancaster County for recording, Heckman was misspelled as Hickman.  The city was incorporated as Hickman in 1885.

Geography
Hickman is located at  (40.621488, -96.631780).

Demographics

2010 census
As of the census of 2010, there were 1,657 people, 587 households, and 463 families residing in the city. The racial makeup of the city was 98.2% White, 0.4% African American, 0.2% Asian, 0.3% from other races, and 0.9% from two or more races. Hispanic or Latino of any race were 1.6% of the population.

There were 587 households, of which 46.7% had children under the age of 18 living with them, 65.9% were married couples living together, 8.9% had a female householder with no husband present, 4.1% had a male householder with no wife present, and 21.1% were non-families. 18.1% of all households were made up of individuals, and 9% had someone living alone who was 65 years of age or older. The average household size was 2.82 and the average family size was 3.22.

The median age in the city was 31.8 years. 33.2% of residents were under the age of 18; 5.7% were between the ages of 18 and 24; 30.2% were from 25 to 44; 23.1% were from 45 to 64; and 7.7% were 65 years of age or older. The gender makeup of the city was 51.7% male and 48.3% female.

See also
 Norris Forest School Arboretum
 Norris School District 160

References

External links
 City of Hickman website

Cities in Nebraska
Cities in Lancaster County, Nebraska
Lincoln, Nebraska metropolitan area